The flame-eared honeyeater (Lichmera flavicans), also known as the yellow-eared honeyeater, is a species of bird in the family Meliphagidae.  It is found on Timor island.  Its natural habitats are subtropical or tropical moist lowland forest and subtropical or tropical moist montane forest.

References

flame-eared honeyeater
Birds of Timor
flame-eared honeyeater
Taxa named by Louis Jean Pierre Vieillot
Taxonomy articles created by Polbot